Plosca is a commune in Teleorman County, Muntenia, Romania. It is composed of a single village, Plosca.

Name
The name is probably derived from a container used for water and beverages (ploscă is the Romanian word for canteen or bota bag).

History
In 1943, the three British SOE members of Operation Autonomous were arrested near Plosca by the Romanian Gendarmerie.

Natives
Liviu Vasilică (1950–2004), folk music singer

References

Communes in Teleorman County
Localities in Muntenia